Yengejeh (also known as Nīgejeh') is a village in Vilkij-e Shomali Rural District, in the Central District of Namin County, Ardabil Province, Iran. At the 2006 census, its population was 45, in 6 families.

References 

Towns and villages in Namin County